The William Bittle Wells House is a house located in southwest Portland, Oregon listed on the National Register of Historic Places.

Wells was the founder and editor of The Pacific Monthly until he sold it in 1906.

See also
 National Register of Historic Places listings in Southwest Portland, Oregon

References

External links
 

1910 establishments in Oregon
Bungalow architecture in Oregon
Houses completed in 1910
Houses on the National Register of Historic Places in Portland, Oregon
Portland Historic Landmarks
Southwest Hills, Portland, Oregon